David McGill (born 28 May 1960) is a Canadian former professional soccer player who played in the North American Soccer League between 1979 and 1981 for the Vancouver Whitecaps, Detroit Express and Washington Diplomats. McGill also earned four caps for the Canadian under-20 side in 1979, and participated at the 1979 FIFA World Youth Championship. In 1986, he played for the Edmonton Brick Men in the Western Soccer Alliance. He played for the Victoria Vistas in 1989.

References

1960 births
Living people
Soccer players from Vancouver
Canadian soccer players
Canadian expatriate soccer players
Expatriate soccer players in the United States
Canadian expatriate sportspeople in the United States
Canada men's youth international soccer players
Edmonton Brick Men players
Vancouver Whitecaps (1974–1984) players
Detroit Express players
Washington Diplomats (NASL) players
North American Soccer League (1968–1984) indoor players
North American Soccer League (1968–1984) players
Western Soccer Alliance players
Victoria Vistas players
Canadian Soccer League (1987–1992) players
Association football midfielders
Ottawa Intrepid players